Samuel Ryan, Jr., (March 13, 1824March 26, 1907) was an American newspaper publisher, Democratic politician, and Wisconsin pioneer.  He was the founder of the Appleton Crescent (now The Post-Crescent), served eight years as county judge of Outagamie County, Wisconsin (1866–1874), and served one year in the Wisconsin State Assembly (1865).

Biography
Ryan was born in Sackets Harbor, New York, in 1824.  As a child, he moved with his parents to Green Bay in 1826, when it was still part of the Michigan Territory.  As a young man in Green Bay, he learned the printing trade, and worked as editor of several pre-statehood papers in Green Bay, including the Green Bay Spectator and the Green Bay Wisconsin Republican.  In 1853, he established the Appleton Crescent, which he edited and published until his death in 1907.

During the American Civil War, he volunteered for service in the 3rd Wisconsin Cavalry Regiment, under the command of former Wisconsin Governor, Colonel William A. Barstow.  Ryan was assigned to quartermaster and commissary detail at Leavenworth, Kansas, but was discharged due to illness in 1863.

After his war service, Ryan returned to Appleton and, in 1864, was elected as a Democrat to the Wisconsin State Assembly, representing Outagamie County in the 1865 session.  During 1865, he was elected County Judge for Outagamie County, where he ultimately served eight years.

Later in life, he was appointed U.S. consul at St. John's, Newfoundland, by President Grover Cleveland.

Ryan died of pneumonia in 1907 at the home of his brother, James, in Appleton, Wisconsin.

Personal life and family
Sam Ryan, Jr., had at least four brothers, including his younger brother James Ryan, who also served as an editor on the Crescent.

He was married three times:  He first married Laura E. Knappen on June 1, 1847, then married Calista M. Crane in 1853, and subsequently married Martha S. Driggs.  His third wife died just 8 days before him.  He had no children.

References

External links
 

People from Sackets Harbor, New York
Politicians from Green Bay, Wisconsin
Politicians from Appleton, Wisconsin
Wisconsin state court judges
Democratic Party members of the Wisconsin State Assembly
American consuls
People of Wisconsin in the American Civil War
Union Army soldiers
19th-century American newspaper publishers (people)
Editors of Wisconsin newspapers
19th-century American newspaper editors
20th-century American newspaper editors
1824 births
1907 deaths
19th-century American politicians
19th-century American judges